Yasnye Zori is a rural locality (a selo) and the administrative center of Yasnozorenskoye Rural Settlement, Belgorodsky District, Belgorod Oblast, Russia. The population was 1,715 as of 2010. There are 17 streets.

Geography 
Yasnye Zori is located 24 km south of Maysky (the district's administrative centre) by road. Cheremoshnoye is the nearest rural locality.

References 

Rural localities in Belgorodsky District